Einer Anton Jensen (6 March 1899 – 18 February 1976) was a Danish boxer who competed in the 1920 Summer Olympics. In 1920 he was eliminated in the first round of the flyweight class after losing his fight to the upcoming bronze medalist William Cuthbertson.

References

External links
Part 3 the boxing tournament

1899 births
1976 deaths
Flyweight boxers
Olympic boxers of Denmark
Boxers at the 1920 Summer Olympics
Danish male boxers